Kyriakos “Kitsos” Tzavelas (1800–1855) was a Souliot fighter in the Greek War of Independence and later a Hellenic Army General and Prime Minister of Greece.

Early years and Greek War of Independence 
Tzavelas was born in Souli, Epirus in 1800, to the Souliote Tzavelas ( Tzavelaioi) clan. He was the son of Fotos Tzavelas and grandson of Lambros Tzavelas, both of whom were famous for their roles in the Souliot struggles against Ali Pasha, the Pasha of Yanina. Tzavelas' mother tongue was the Souliotic dialect of Albanian. He grew up in exile in Kerkyra. Due to the Albanian element being until then dominant amongst the Souliotes, the Souliote leaders - such as Kitsos and Markos Botsaris - were known by their Albanian names (Kiço Xhavella and Marko Boçari respectively), although they certainly also spoke Greek with Kitsos probably having learnt it during his exile in Kerkyra. 

Upon his return to mainland Greece in 1822, he became the head of his family and fara (minor Albanian clan). He settled his clan in Missolonghi. He was initially under the patronage of Georgios Karaiskakis at the beginning of the Greek War of Independence, but would switch to the faction of Alexandros Mavrokordatos when Karaiskakis was implicated in secret negotiations with the Ottomans. However, this did not aid them in their rivalry with the Botsaris clan - a fellow Souliot clan - as the Botsaris were favoured due to having prior membership in the faction. After plundering Agrafa (which was held by Karaiskakis' revolutionary faction) on the orders of Mavrokordatos, the Tzavelas clan rejoined Karaiskakis and abandoned Mavrokordatos due to him designating Markos Botsaris "General of Western Greece". The two clans had a very deep hostility to each other that, throughout the war, they supported opposing factions and refused to fight under the same command.

When Ibrahim Pasha invaded the Peloponnese in 1825, Tzavellas, together with Kitsos Botsaris and Georgios Karaiskakis were among the  Greek leaders to advance in Messenia and succeeded to relieve the siege of Navarino.

In his speech to the Third National Council of the provisional Greek government in 1826, Tzavelas stressed the sacrifice of the Souliotes for a common fatherland. In 1827, Tzavelas had campaigned successfully in central Rumeli, and would eventually recapture Karpenisi on December 15.

The fact that Tzavelas and the other Souliote leaders gradually integrated in the Greek national cause was noticed by and perhaps amused their contemporaries, such as the embittered Ahmet Nepravistha, the dervenaga of Kravara, who in a letter to Kitsos Tzavellas in September 1828 asking him to surrender, took note of their mutation, and pointing out their shared Albanian origin sarcastically called into question Tzavellas' Greekness. After defeating him next month, in October 1828, Tzavellas had Ahmet's and his men's foreheads stigmatized with the Phoenix; the emblem of the First Hellenic Republic.

Post-Independence 

At the Fifth National Assembly at Nafplion (late 1831- early 1832) the Souliotes were represented by Kitsos Tzavelas and Ioannis Bairaktaris. After many debates and requests by Souliotes to be given land, the delegates of the assembly agreed to give land only to Souliotes who fought in the war and to allow them to build their settlements in limited properties in Nafpaktos and Agrinio.

After Independence, Tzavelas became a supporter of Kapodistrias and eventually a leader in the Russian Party which was the conservative and arch-Orthodox political faction in the period of King Otto. Accused of planning a revolt against the king in 1834, Tzavelas was imprisoned by the Regency Council along with other politicians of the Russian Party. When King Otto came of age and took over the reins of government, Tzavelas was released and later was named aide-de-camp to the king. Otto gave a large area of forest near Missolonghi to Tzavelas.

He was subsequently appointed Minister of War in 1844 and, in 1847-1848, Prime Minister. In 1854, during the Crimean War, a number of Greek military officers of Souliote descent, under Kitsos Tzavelas, participated in a failed revolt in Epirus, demanding union with Greece.

Kitsos Tzavelas died in Athens on 21 March 1855, leaving behind his wife Vasiliki Tzavela.

He is buried in the First Cemetery of Athens.

See also
 Greek War of Independence
 List of prime ministers of Greece

References

Sources
 John A. Petropulos; Politics and Statecraft in the Kingdom of Greece; Princeton University Press, 1968

1800 births
1855 deaths
19th-century prime ministers of Greece
Prime Ministers of Greece
Souliotes
Greek military leaders of the Greek War of Independence
Greek revolutionaries
Russian Party politicians